Samuel Colt (July 19, 1814 – January 10, 1862) was an American inventor, industrialist, and businessman who established Colt's Patent Fire-Arms Manufacturing Company (now Colt's Manufacturing Company) and made the mass production of revolvers commercially viable.

Colt's first two business ventures were producing firearms in Paterson, New Jersey, and making underwater mines; both ended in disappointment. His business affairs improved rapidly after 1847, when the Texas Rangers ordered 1,000 revolvers during the American war with Mexico. Later, his firearms were used widely during the settling of the western frontier. Colt died in 1862 as one of the wealthiest men in America.

Colt's manufacturing methods were sophisticated. His use of interchangeable parts helped him become one of the first to use the assembly line efficiently. Moreover, his innovative use of art, celebrity endorsements, and corporate gifts to promote his wares made him a pioneer of advertising, product placement, and mass marketing.

Early years (1814–1835) 

Samuel Colt was born in Hartford, Connecticut, the son of Christopher Colt (1780–1850), a farmer who had relocated his family to the city after he became a businessman, and Sarah (née Caldwell). His maternal grandfather, Major John Caldwell, had been an officer of the Continental Army; one of Colt's earliest possessions was John's flintlock pistol. Colt's mother died from tuberculosis when Colt was six years old, and his father married Olivia Sargeant two years later. Colt had three sisters, one of whom died during her childhood. His oldest sister, Margaret, died of tuberculosis at age 19, and the other, Sarah Ann, later committed suicide. One brother, James, became a lawyer; another, Christopher, was a textile merchant. A third brother, John C. Colt, a man of many occupations, was convicted of an 1841 murder and committed suicide on the day he was to be executed.

At age 11, Colt was indentured to a farmer in Glastonbury, where he did chores and attended school. Here he was introduced to the Compendium of Knowledge, a scientific encyclopedia that he preferred to read rather than his Bible studies. Its articles concerning Robert Fulton and gunpowder motivated Colt throughout his life. He discovered that other inventors in the Compendium had accomplished feats that were once deemed impossible, and he wanted to do the same. Later, after hearing soldiers talk about the success of the double-barreled rifle and the impossibility of a gun that could shoot five or six times without reloading, Colt decided that he would create the "impossible gun".

During 1829, at the age of 15, Colt began working in his father's textile plant in Ware, Massachusetts, where he had access to tools, materials, and the factory workers' expertise. Referencing the encyclopedia, Samuel built a homemade galvanic cell and advertised as a Fourth of July event during that year that he would explode a raft on Ware Pond using underwater explosives; although the raft was missed, the explosion was still impressive. Sent to boarding school, he amused his classmates with pyrotechnics. During 1830, a July 4 accident caused a fire that ended his schooling, and his father sent him away to learn the seaman's trade. On a voyage to Calcutta aboard the brig Corvo, Colt had the idea for a type of revolver while at sea, inspired by the capstan, or windlass, which had a ratchet-and-pawl mechanism that he would later say gave him the idea for his revolver designs. On the Corvo, Colt made a wooden model of a pepperbox revolver out of scrap wood. It differed from other pepperbox revolvers at the time in that it allowed the shooter to rotate the cylinder by the action of cocking the hammer, with an attached pawl turning the cylinder, which was then locked firmly in alignment with one of the barrels by a bolt, a great improvement over the pepperbox designs, which required rotating the barrels by hand and hoping for proper indexing and alignment.

When Colt returned to the United States during 1832, he resumed working for his father, who financed the production of two guns, a rifle and a pistol. The first completed pistol exploded when it was fired, but the rifle performed well. His father would not finance any more development, so Samuel needed to find a way to pay for the development of his ideas. He had learned about nitrous oxide (laughing gas) from the factory chemist of his father's textile plant, so he took a portable laboratory on tour and earned a living performing laughing gas demonstrations across the United States and Canada, calling himself as "the Celebrated Dr. Coult of New-York, London and Calcutta". Colt thought of himself as a man of science and believed if he could enlighten people about a new idea like nitrous oxide, he could in turn make people more receptive to his new idea concerning a revolver. He started his lectures on street corners and soon began doing the same in lecture halls and museums. As ticket sales decreased, Colt realized that "serious" museum lectures were not what the people wanted to pay money to hear and that it was dramatic stories of salvation and redemption the public craved. While visiting his brother John in Cincinnati, he partnered with sculptor Hiram Powers for his demonstrations with a theme based on The Divine Comedy. Powers made detailed wax sculptures and paintings based on demons, centaurs, and mummies from Dante's work. Colt constructed fireworks to complete the show, which was a success. According to Colt historian Robert Lawrence Wilson, the "lectures launched Colt's celebrated career as a pioneer Madison Avenue-style pitchman". His public speaking skills were so prized that he was thought to be a doctor and was obligated to cure an apparent cholera epidemic aboard a riverboat by giving his patients a dose of nitrous oxide.

Having saved some money and still wanting to be an inventor as opposed to a "medicine man", Colt made arrangements to begin building guns using proper gunsmiths from Baltimore, Maryland. He abandoned the idea of a multiple-barreled revolver and opted for a single fixed-barrel design with a rotating cylinder. The action of the hammer would align the cylinder bores with the single barrel. He sought the counsel of a friend of his father, Henry Leavitt Ellsworth, who loaned him $300 and advised him to perfect his prototype before applying for a patent. Colt hired a gunsmith by the name of John Pearson to build his revolver. Over the next few years, Colt and Pearson argued about money, but the design improved and during 1835 Colt was ready to apply for his U.S. patent. Ellsworth was now the superintendent of the U.S. Patent Office and advised Colt to file for foreign patents first, as a prior U.S. patent would keep Colt from filing a patent in the United Kingdom. In August 1835, Colt left for England and France to secure his foreign patent.

Colt's early revolver (1835–43) 

During 1835, Samuel Colt traveled to the United Kingdom, much as had Elisha Collier, a Bostonian who had patented a revolving flintlock there that achieved great popularity. Despite the reluctance of English officials to issue a patent to Colt, no fault could be found with the gun and he was issued his first patent (number 6909). Upon his return to America, he applied for his U.S. patent for a "revolving gun"; he was granted the patent on February 25, 1836 (later numbered 9430X). This instrument and patent number 1304, dated August 29, 1836, protected the basic principles of his revolving-breech loading, folding trigger firearm named the Colt Paterson.

With a loan from his cousin Dudley Selden and letters of recommendation from Ellsworth, Colt formed a corporation of venture capitalists in 1836 to bring his idea to market. With the help of the political acquaintances of these venture capitalists, the Patent Arms Manufacturing Company of Paterson, New Jersey, was chartered by the New Jersey legislature on March 5, 1836. Colt was given a royalty for each gun sold in exchange for his patent rights and stipulated the return of the rights if the company disbanded.

Colt never claimed to have invented revolvers; his design was a more practical adaption of Collier's earlier revolving flintlock incorporating a locking bolt to keep the cylinder aligned with the barrel. The invention of the percussion cap made ignition more reliable, faster, and safer than the older flintlock design. Colt's great contribution was the use of interchangeable parts. Knowing that some gun parts were made by machine, he envisioned all the parts of every Colt gun to be interchangeable and made by machine, to be assembled later by hand. His goal was an assembly line. This is shown by an 1836 letter that Colt wrote to his father in which he said, 

Colt's U.S. revolver patent gave him a monopoly of revolver manufacture until 1857. His was the first practical revolver and the first practical repeating firearm, thanks to progress made in percussion technology. No longer a mere novelty weapon, the revolver became an industrial and cultural legacy, as well as a contribution to the development of war technology, represented ironically by the name of one of his company's later innovations, the "Peacemaker".

Early problems and failures 
Although by the end of 1837 the Arms Company had made more than 1,000 weapons, there were no sales. After the Panic of 1837, the company's underwriters were reluctant to fund the new machinery that Colt needed to make interchangeable parts, so he went on the road to raise money. Demonstrating his gun to people in general stores did not generate the sales volume he needed, so with another loan from his cousin Selden, he went to Washington, D.C., and demonstrated it to President Andrew Jackson. Jackson approved of the gun and wrote Colt a note saying so. With this letter, Colt got a bill approved by Congress endorsing a demonstration for the military, but failed to obtain an appropriation for military purchase of the weapon. A promising order from the state of South Carolina for 50 to 75 pistols was canceled when the company did not produce them quickly enough.

Constant problems for Colt were the provisions of the Militia Act of 1808, which stated that any arms purchased by a state militia had to be in current service in the United States military. This act prevented state militias from allocating funds towards the purchase of experimental weapons or foreign weapons.

Colt imperiled his own company by his reckless spending. Selden often chastised him for using corporate funds to buy an expensive wardrobe or give lavish gifts to potential clients. Selden twice prohibited Colt from using company money for liquor and fancy dinners; Colt thought getting potential customers inebriated would generate more sales.

The company was briefly saved by the war against the Seminoles in Florida which provided the first sale of Colt's revolvers and his new revolving rifles. The soldiers in Florida praised the new weapon, but the unusual hammerless design, sixty years ahead of its time, resulted in difficulty in training men who were used to exposed-hammer guns. Consequently, many curious soldiers took the locks apart. This resulted in breakage of parts, stripped screw heads and inoperable guns. Colt soon reworked his design to leave the firing hammer exposed, but problems continued. During late 1843, after the loss of payment for the Florida pistols, the Paterson plant closed and a public auction was held in New York City to sell the company's most liquid assets.

Mines and tinfoil 
Colt did not refrain long from manufacturing and began selling underwater electrical detonators and waterproof cable of his own invention. Soon after the failure of the Patent Arms Manufacturing Company, he teamed with Samuel Morse to lobby the US government for funds. Colt's waterproof cable, made from tar-coated copper, proved valuable when Morse ran telegraph lines under lakes, rivers, and bays and made attempts to lay a telegraph line under the Atlantic Ocean. Morse used the battery from one of Colt's mines to transmit a telegraph message from Manhattan to Governors Island when his own battery was too weak to send the signal.

When tensions with the British prompted Congress to appropriate funds for Colt's project toward the end of 1841, he demonstrated his underwater mines to the US government. During 1842 he used one of the devices to destroy a moving vessel to the satisfaction of the United States Navy and President John Tyler. However, opposition from John Quincy Adams, who was serving as a US Representative from Massachusetts's 8th congressional district, scuttled the project as "not fair and honest warfare" and termed the Colt mine an "unchristian contraption".

After this setback, Colt turned his attention to perfecting tinfoil cartridges he had originally designed for use in his revolvers. The standard at the time was to have powder and ball contained in a paper or skin envelope or "cartridge" for ease of loading. However, if the paper got wet it would ruin the powder. Colt tried alternative materials such as rubber cement, but decided to use a thin type of tinfoil. During 1841 he made samples of these cartridges for the army. During tests of the foil cartridges, 25 rounds were shot from a musket without cleaning. When the breech plug was removed from the barrel no fouling from the tin foil was evident. The reception was moderate and the army purchased a few thousand rounds for further testing. During 1843 the army gave Colt an order for 200,000 of the tinfoil cartridges packed 10 to a box for use in muskets.

With the money made from the cartridges, Colt resumed business with Morse for ideas other than detonating mines. Colt concentrated on manufacturing his waterproof telegraph cable, believing the business would prosper along with Morse's invention. He began promoting the telegraph companies so he could create a greater market for his cable, for which he was to be paid $50 per mile. Colt tried to use this revenue to resurrect the Patent Arms Manufacturing Company, but could not secure funds from other investors or even his own family. This left Colt time to improve his earlier revolver design and have a prototype built by a gunsmith in New York for his "New and improved revolver". This new revolver had a stationary trigger and had a larger caliber. Colt submitted his single prototype to the War Department as a "Holster revolver".

Colt's Patent Manufacturing Company (1847–1860) 

Captain Samuel Walker of the Texas Rangers had acquired some of the first Colt revolvers produced during the Seminole War and saw first-hand their effective use as his 15-man unit defeated a larger force of 70 Comanches in Texas. Walker wanted to order Colt revolvers for use by the Rangers in the Mexican–American War, and traveled to New York City in search of Colt. He met Colt in a gunsmith's shop on January 4, 1847, and ordered 1,000 revolvers. Walker asked for a few changes; the new revolvers would have to hold 6 shots instead of 5, have enough power to kill either a human or a horse with a single shot and be quicker to reload. The large order allowed Colt to establish a new firearm business. Colt hired Eli Whitney Blake, who was established in the arms business, to make his guns. Colt used his prototype and Walker's improvements as the basis for a new design. From this new design, Blake produced the first thousand-piece order known as the Colt Walker. The company then received an order for a thousand more; Colt shared the profits at $10 per pistol for both orders.

With the money he made from the sales of the Walkers and a loan from his cousin, banker Elisha Colt, Colt bought the machinery and tooling from Blake to build his own factory: Colt's Patent Fire-Arms Manufacturing Company factory at Hartford. The first revolving-breech pistols made at the factory were named "Whitneyville-Hartford-Dragoons" and became so popular that the word "Colt" was often used as a generic term for the revolvers. The Whitneyville-Hartford Dragoons, largely built from leftover Walker parts, are known as the first model in the transition from the Walker to the Dragoon series. Beginning 1848, more contracts followed for what is known now as the Colt Dragoon Revolvers. These models were based on the Walker Colts, and during three generations slight changes to each model showed the evolution of the design. The improvements were  barrels for accuracy, shorter chambers and an improved loading lever. The shorter chambers were loaded to 50 grains of powder, instead of 60 grains in the earlier Walkers, to prevent the occurrence of ruptured cylinders. Finally, a positive catch was installed at the end of the loading lever to prevent the lever from dropping due to recoil.

Besides being used in the war with Mexico, Colt's revolvers were employed as a sidearm by both civilians and soldiers. Colt's revolvers were a major tool used during the westward expansion. A revolver which could fire six times without reloading helped soldiers and settlers fend off larger forces which were not armed in the same way. During 1848, Colt introduced smaller versions of his pistols known as Baby Dragoons that were made for civilian use. During 1850 General Sam Houston and General Thomas Jefferson Rusk lobbied Secretary of War William Marcy and President James K. Polk to adopt Colt's revolvers for the U.S. military. Rusk testified: "Colt's Repeating Arms are the most efficient weapons in the world and the only weapon which has enabled the frontiersman to defeat the mounted Indian in his own peculiar mode of warfare". Lt. Bedley McDonald, who was a subordinate of Walker when Walker was killed in Mexico, stated that 30 Rangers used Colt's revolvers to keep 500 Mexicans in check. Colt used this general design for the Colt 1851 Navy Revolver which was larger than the Baby Dragoon, but not quite as large as the full-sized version. The gun became the standard sidearm for U.S. military officers and proved popular among civilian buyers. After the testimony by Houston and Rusk, the next issue became how quickly Colt could supply the military. Ever the opportunist, when the War with Mexico was ended, Colt sent agents south of the border to procure sales from the Mexican government.

Patent extension 

During this period, Colt received an extension on his patent, since he did not collect fees for it during the early years. During 1869, gun makers James Warner and Massachusetts Arms infringed on the patent. Colt sued the companies and the court ordered that Warner and Massachusetts Arms cease revolver production. Colt then threatened to sue Allen & Thurber due to the cylinder design of their double-action pepperbox revolver. However, Colt's lawyers doubted that this suit would be successful and the case was resolved with a settlement of $15,000. Production of Allen pepperboxes continued until the expiration of Colt's patent during 1857. During 1854 Colt struggled for his patent extension with the U.S. Congress, which initiated a special committee to investigate charges that Colt had bribed government officials in securing this extension. By August he was exonerated and the story became national news when the magazine Scientific American reported that the fault was not with Colt, but with Washington politicians. With a virtual monopoly, Colt sold his pistols in Europe, where demand was high due to tense international relations. By telling each nation that the others were buying Colt's pistols, Colt was able to get large orders from many countries who feared falling behind in the arms race.

A major cause of Colt's success was vigorous protection of his patent rights. Even though he had the only lawful patent for his type of revolver, scores of imitators copied his work and Colt found himself litigating constantly. For each one of these cases, Colt's lawyer, Edward N. Dickerson, deftly exploited the patent system and successfully ended the competition. However, Colt's zealous protection of his patents greatly impeded firearms development as a whole in the United States. His preoccupation with patent infringement suits slowed his own company's transition to the cartridge system and prevented other firms from pursuing revolver designs. At the same time, Colt's policies forced some competing inventors to greater innovation by denying them major features of his mechanism; as a result they created their own.

Colt knew he had to make his revolvers affordable, as the doom of many great inventions was a high retail price. Colt fixed his prices at a level below his competition to maximize sales volume. From his experience in haggling with government officials, he knew what numbers he would have to generate to make enough profit to invest money in improving his machinery, thereby limiting imitators' ability to produce a comparable weapon at a lesser price. Although successful at this, for the most part, his preoccupation with marketing strategies and patent protection caused him to miss a great opportunity in firearms development when he dismissed an idea from one of his gunsmiths, Rollin White. White had an idea of a "bored-through" revolver cylinder to allow cartridges (made of paper at the time) to be loaded from the rear of the cylinder. Only one gun fitting White's design was ever made, and it was not considered practical for the ammunition of the time. A year after White left Colt, Colt's competitor, Smith & Wesson, attempted to patent a revolver using metallic cartridges only to find that it infringed on White's patent for the bored-through cylinder. They then licensed that component of White's patent and kept Colt from being able to build cartridge firearms for almost 20 years.

Colt's armories

Hartford 

Colt purchased a large tract of land beside the Connecticut River, where he built his first factory during 1848, a larger factory named the Colt Armory during 1855, a manor that he called Armsmear during 1856, and employee tenement housing. He established a ten-hour work day for employees, installed washing stations in the factory, mandated a one-hour lunch period, and built the Charter Oak Hall, where employees could enjoy games, newspapers, and discussion rooms. Colt managed his plant with a military-like discipline: he would dismiss workers for tardiness, sub-par work or even suggesting improvements to his designs.

Colt hired Elisha K. Root as his chief mechanic in arranging the plant's machinery. Root had been successful in an earlier venture automating the production of axes and made, bought, or improved jigs, fixtures and profile machinery for Colt. Over the years he developed specialized machinery for stock turning or cutting the rifling in gun barrels. Root has been credited as "the first to build special purpose machinery and apply it to the manufacture of a commercial product". Colt historian Herbert G. Houze wrote, "had it not been for Root's inventive genius, Colt's dream of mass production would never have been realized".

Thus, Colt's factory was the first to make use of the concept known as the assembly line. The idea was not new but was never successful in industry at the time because of the lack of interchangeable parts. Root's machinery changed that for Colt, since the machines completed as much as 80% of the work and less than 20% of the parts required hand fitting and filing. Colt's revolvers were made by machine, but he insisted on final hand finishing and polishing of his revolvers to impart a handmade feel. Colt hired artisan gun makers from Bavaria and developed a commercial use for Waterman Ormsby's grammagraph to produce "roll-die" engraving on steel, particularly on the cylinders. He hired Bavarian engraver Gustave Young for fine hand engraving on his more "custom" pieces. In an attempt to attract skilled European-immigrant workers to his plant, Colt built a village near the factory away from the tenements which he named Coltsville and modeled the homes after a village in Potsdam. In an effort to end the flooding from the river he planted German osiers, a type of willow tree, in a 2-mile-long dike. He subsequently built a factory to manufacture wicker furniture made from these trees.

On June 5, 1856, Colt married Elizabeth Jarvis, the daughter of the Rev. William Jarvis, who lived downriver from Hartford. The wedding was lavish and featured the ceremony on a steamship overlooking the factory as well as fireworks and rifle salutes. The couple had four children: two daughters and a son who died in infancy and a son born during 1858, Caldwell Hart Colt.

London 

Soon after establishing his Hartford factory, Colt decided to establish a factory in or near Europe and chose London. He organized a large display of his firearms at the Great Exhibition of 1851 at Hyde Park, London and ingratiated himself by presenting cased engraved Colt revolvers to such appropriate officials as Britain's Master General of the Ordnance. At one exhibit Colt disassembled ten guns and reassembled ten guns using different parts from different guns. As the world's major proponent of mass production techniques, Colt delivered a lecture concerning the subject to the Institution of Civil Engineers (ICE) in London. The membership rewarded his efforts by awarding him the Silver Telford Medal. With help from ICE secretary Charles Manby Colt established his London operation near Vauxhall Bridge on the River Thames and began production on January 1, 1853. During a tour of the factory, Charles Dickens was so impressed with the facilities that he recorded his comments of Colt's revolvers in an 1852 edition of Household Words:
 
Among the pistols, we saw Colt's revolver; and we compared it with the best English revolver. The advantage of Colt's over the English is, that the user can take a sight; and the disadvantage is, that the weapon requires both hands to fire.

The factory's machines mass-produced parts that were completely interchangeable and could be put together on assembly lines using standardized patterns and gauges by unskilled labor, as opposed to England's principal gun makers who made each part by hand. Colt's London factory remained in operation for only four years. Unwilling to alter his open-top single-action design for the solid frame double-action revolver that the British asked for, Colt sold scarcely 23,000 revolvers to the British Army and Navy. During 1856 he closed the London plant and had the machinery, tooling, and unfinished guns shipped to Hartford.

Marketing 
When foreign heads of state would not grant him an audience, as he was only a private citizen, he persuaded the governor of the state of Connecticut to make him a lieutenant colonel and aide-de-camp of the state militia. With this rank, he toured Europe again to promote his revolvers. He used marketing techniques which were innovative at the time. He frequently gave custom engraved versions of his revolvers to heads of state, military officers, and celebrities such as Giuseppe Garibaldi, King Victor Emmanuel II of Italy, and Hungarian rebel Lajos Kossuth. Colt commissioned western artist George Catlin to produce a series of paintings depicting exotic scenes in which a Colt weapon was prominently used against Indians, wild animals, or bandits in the earliest form of "product placement" advertisement. He placed numerous advertisements in the same newspapers; The Knickerbocker published as many as eight in the same edition. Lastly, he hired authors to write stories about his guns for magazines and travel guides. One of Colt's biggest acts of self-promotion was the payment to the publishers of United States Magazine $1,120 ($61,439 by 1999 standards) to publish a 29-page fully illustrated story showing the inner workings of his factory.

After his revolvers had gained acceptance, Colt had his staff search for unsolicited news stories containing mention of his guns that he could excerpt and reprint. He went so far as to hire agents in other states and territories to find such samples, to buy hundreds of copies for himself and to give the editor a free revolver for writing them, particularly if such a story disparaged his competition. Many of the revolvers Colt gave away as "gifts" had inscriptions such as "Compliments of Col. Colt" or "From the Inventor" engraved on the back straps. Later versions contained his entire signature which was used in many of his advertisements as a centerpiece, using his celebrity as a seeming guarantee of the performance of his weapons. Colt eventually secured a trademark for his signature.

One of his slogans, “God created men, Col. Colt made them equal,” (claiming that any person could, regardless of physical strength, defend themselves with a Colt gun) became a popular adage in American culture.

Later years and death 
Before the American Civil War, Colt supplied both the North and the South with firearms. He had been known to sell weapons to warring parties on both sides of other conflicts in Europe and did the same with respect to the war in America. During 1859 Colt considered building an armory in the South and as late as 1861 had sold 2,000 revolvers to Confederate agent John Forsyth. Although trade with the South had not been restricted at that time, newspapers such as the New York Daily Tribune, The New York Times and the Hartford Daily Courant termed him a Southern sympathizer and traitor to the Union. In response to these charges, Colt was commissioned as a colonel by the state of Connecticut on May 16, 1861, of the 1st Regiment Colts Revolving Rifles of Connecticut armed with the Colt revolving rifle. Colt envisioned this unit as being staffed by men more than six feet tall and armed with his weapons. However, the unit was never sent to the field and Colt was discharged on June 20, 1861.

Samuel Colt died of complications of gout in Hartford on January 10, 1862.  He was interred on the property of his private residence Armsmear and reinterred to Cedar Hill Cemetery in 1894.  At the time of his death, Colt's estate, which he willed to his wife and three-year-old son Caldwell Hart Colt, was estimated to be valued at about $15,000,000. His professional responsibilities were given to his brother-in-law, Richard Jarvis. The only other person mentioned in Colt's will was Samuel Caldwell Colt, the son of his brother, John C. Colt.

Colt historian William Edwards wrote that Samuel Colt had married Caroline Henshaw (who later married his brother, John) in Scotland during 1838, and that the son she bore later was Samuel Colt's and not his brother John's. In a 1953 biography about Samuel Colt based largely on family letters, Edwards wrote that John Colt's marriage to Caroline during 1841 was a way to legitimize her unborn son as the real father, Samuel Colt, felt she was not fit to be the wife of an industrialist and divorce was a social stigma at the time. After John's death, Samuel Colt cared financially for the child, named Samuel Caldwell Colt, with a large allowance, and paid for his tuition in what were described as "the finest private schools." In correspondence to and about his namesake, Samuel Colt referred to him as his "nephew" in quotes. Historians such as Edwards and Harold Schechter have said this was the elder Colt's way of letting the world know that the boy was his own son without saying so directly. After Colt's death, he left the boy $2 million by 2010 standards. Colt's widow, Elizabeth Jarvis Colt, and her brother, Richard Jarvis contested this. In probate court Caroline's son Sam produced a valid marriage license showing that Caroline and Samuel Colt were married in Scotland during 1838 and that this document made him a rightful heir to part of Colt's estate, if not to the Colt Manufacturing Company.

Legacy 
It is estimated that during its first 25 years of manufacturing, Colt's company produced more than 400,000 revolvers. Before his death, each barrel was stamped: "Address Col. Samuel Colt, New York, US America", or a variation using a London address. Colt did this as New York and London were major cosmopolitan cities and he retained an office in New York at 155 Broadway where he based his salesmen.

Colt was the first American manufacturer to use art as a marketing tool when he hired Catlin to prominently display Colt firearms in his paintings. He was awarded numerous government contracts after making gifts of his highly embellished and engraved revolvers with exotic grips such as ivory or pearl to government officials. On a visit to Constantinople he gave a custom-engraved and gold inlaid revolver to the Sultan of the Ottoman Empire Abdülmecid I, informing him that the Russians were buying his pistols, thus securing a Turkish order for 5,000 pistols; he neglected to tell the Sultan he had used the same tactic with the Russians to elicit an order.

Apart from gifts and bribes, Colt employed an effective marketing program which comprised sales promotion, publicity, product sampling, and public relations. He used the newspress to his own advantage by giving revolvers to editors, prompting them to report "all the accidents that occur to the Sharps & other humbug arms", and listing incidents for which Colt weapons had been "well used against bears, Indians, Mexicans, etc". Colt's firearms did not always fare well in standardized military tests; he preferred written testimonials from individual soldiers who used his weapons and these were what he most relied on to secure government contracts.

Colt felt that bad press was just as important as good press, provided that his name and his revolvers received mention. When he opened the London armory, he posted a 14-foot sign on the roof across from Parliament reading: "Colonel Colt's Pistol Factory" as a publicity stunt, which was noted by the British press. Eventually the British government forced him to remove this sign. Colt historian Herbert Houze wrote that Colt championed the concept of modernism before the word was invented, he pioneered the use of celebrity endorsements to promote his products, he introduced the phrase "new and improved" to advertising and demonstrated the commercial value of trade-name recognition as a word for "revolver" in French is le colt. Barbara M. Tucker, professor of history and director of the Center for Connecticut Studies at Eastern Connecticut State University, wrote that Colt's marketing techniques transformed the firearm from a utilitarian object into a symbol of American identity. Tucker added that Colt associated his revolvers with American patriotism, freedom, and individualism while asserting America's technological supremacy over Europe's.

In 1867, Colt's widow, Elizabeth, had an Episcopal church designed by Edward Tuckerman Potter built as a memorial to him and the three children they lost. The church's architecture contains guns and gun-smithing tools sculpted in marble to commemorate Colt's life as an arms maker. In 1896 a parish house was built on the site as a memorial to their son, Caldwell, who died in 1894. In 1975, the Church of the Good Shepherd and Parish House was listed in the National Register of Historic Places.

Colt established libraries and educational programs within his armories for his employees which provided training for several generations of toolmakers and other machinists, who had great influence in other manufacturing efforts of the next half century. Prominent examples included Francis A. Pratt, Amos Whitney, Henry Leland, Edward Bullard, Worcester R. Warner, Charles Brinckerhoff Richards, William Mason and Ambrose Swasey.

In 2006, Samuel Colt was inducted into the National Inventors Hall of Fame.

Footnotes

Bibliography 

 
 
 
 
 
 
 
 
 
 
 
 
 
 
 Lundeberg, Philip K., Samuel Colt's submarine battery: the secret and the enigma. Washington, Smithsonian Institution Press, 1974.

Further reading

External links 
 The Colt Revolver in the American West at the Autry National Center
 Samuel Colt biography at Netstate.com

1814 births
1862 deaths
19th-century American inventors
American Civil War industrialists
American manufacturing businesspeople
Burials at Cedar Hill Cemetery (Hartford, Connecticut)
Businesspeople from Hartford, Connecticut

Firearm designers
Gunsmiths
People of Connecticut in the American Civil War
Union Army officers
Union Army colonels
Weapon designers
Colt family